Guang Weiran (1 November 1913 – 28 January 2002), born Zhang Guangnian, was a Chinese poet and military leader. He is best known for writing the poem that inspired the Yellow River Cantata.

Life 
Guang Weiran was born in Laohekou, Hubei in 1913. He dropped out of high school to participate in the Great Revolution. In doing so, he joined the Communist Party of China in 1929. He then enrolled in Wuchang University of China. He was inspired to write the Yellow River Cantata as an "anti-Japanese propaganda" technique when Japan invaded China in 1939. It was said that while leading his troops into battle, he fell off his horse and broke his left arm which gave him time to write the poem. It is also said that while travelling, he saw fishermen singing uplifting songs which also inspired him to write the poem. In 1977, he became the chief editor of People's Literature.  He died in 2002 at the age of 89.

Notes 

20th-century Chinese poets
Poets from Hubei
People's Republic of China poets
1913 births
2002 deaths